"Deliverance" is a song by American rapper Bubba Sparxxx, released as the second single from his second studio album of the same name. The song features production from Timbaland, who also provides guest vocals in the chorus. Timbaland makes an appearance in the video, strumming a guitar in front of a town sign at an intersection that says "Deliverance, GA. Pop: 501"

Music video
The music video is influenced by the film O Brother, Where Art Thou?, showing convicts escaping from a chain-gang in the mid-20th century rural South. The video was directed by Bryan Barber.

Charts

References

2003 singles
2003 songs
Bubba Sparxxx songs
Timbaland songs
Interscope Records singles
Song recordings produced by Timbaland
Songs written by Timbaland
Music videos directed by Bryan Barber